Paweł Barylski (born 20 September 1975) is a Polish football coach. Usually an assistant manager, he was the interim manager of Śląsk Wrocław on three occasions. He most recently was in charge of I liga side Górnik Polkowice.

Football

Barylski played for MKS Łodzianka, but retired at the age of 24 when he realised he was not good enough for a career in football. After retiring from football, Barylski held positions with the Lotnik Wrocław youth team and the Gawina Królewska Wola reserve side. In 2010 Barylski became interim manager in 2010, before becoming the assistant manager of Śląsk Wrocław when Orest Lenczyk was appointed. After Lenczyk was sacked in 2012, Barylski became the interim manager again. After being part of the coaching staff, Barylski once again became the assistant manager with the newly appointed Tadeusz Pawłowski and kept his position when Romuald Szukiełowicz was manager of Śląsk. In 2016 Barylski joined the coaching staff of Miedź Legnica for a season, becoming the assistant manager to Ryszard Tarasiewicz. After Tarasiewicz was sacked by Miedź, Barylski once again joined Śląsk Wrocław in 2018, teaming up with Tadeusz Pawłowski for the second time. After Pawłowski was sacked by Śląsk, Barylski became the interim manager for the third time.

References

1975 births
Living people
Polish football managers
Śląsk Wrocław managers
Sportspeople from Łódź